Pierre Hantaï (born 28 February 1964, Paris) is a French harpsichordist and conductor.

Career 
The son of painter Simon Hantaï, he discovered the music of Johann Sebastian Bach when he was ten and first heard Gustav Leonhardt's recordings when he was eleven. He took up the harpsichord when he was eleven and was self-taught until meeting his first teacher, the American harpsichordist Arthur Haas. He later studied for two years in Amsterdam with Gustav Leonhardt. In 1983 he won the second prize in the Bruges harpsichord competition.

His first recordings focused on the English virginalists (Giles Farnaby and John Bull), and on Bach. Influential solo recordings include two Goldberg Variations, released ten years apart (1993, 2003), and an ongoing series of Domenico Scarlatti’s sonatas. Following a first CD for Astrée in 1993, he has recorded six more volumes of Scarlatti recitals for Mirare between 2002 and 2019. Other solo recordings include the Well-Tempered Clavier, Book I, three recordings dedicated to Bach’s toccatas and suites, as well as recordings of Frescobaldi and Couperin.

He performs internationally as a soloist across Europe, North America and Asia at festivals such as La Roque d'Anthéron, La Folle Journée de Nantes, Festival Oude Muziek Utrecht, the Boston Early Music Festival, at Carnegie Hall, the Fundação Calouste Gulbenkian, and Hakuju Hall in Tokyo.

In 1991, he and his brother Jérôme recorded part of the soundtrack to the French film Tous les matins du monde.

In 1985, he founded the ensemble Le Concert Français, which he conducted from the harpsichord and which recorded both orchestral and chamber repertoire.

He frequently performs with his two brothers, Marc (traverso) and Jérôme (viola da gamba) as part of the Trio Hantaï. He played for many years with La Petite Bande (directed by Sigiswald Kuijken), and he continues to perform with Jordi Savall, Hugo Reyne, and Maude Gratton. He has collaborated with many other musicians, including Philippe Herreweghe and Marc Minkowski.

Teaching 
Pierre Hantaï has never held a permanent teaching post in a conservatory.

During the 1990s, he taught privately. His students, including Bertrand Cuiller and Maude Gratton, continued their studies at the CNSM de Paris with Christophe Rousset and Olivier Baumont. In 2000, Hantaï replaced Rousset, then the harpsichord professor at the CNSM, during his sabbatical year. At the end of the year, Rousset quit and a job search was held as a formality, with the expectation that Hantaï would succeed Rousset and continue to work with his students at the CNSM. In what one student called an unexpected twist that shook the harpsichord class, though, he lost the post to Baumont, who has been the harpsichord professor at the CNSM since 2001.

Since then, he has largely limited his teaching activities to master classes (Villa Medici, Fondation Royaumont, Académie de Villecroze, Accademia Europea Villa Bossi, etc.). He tutored the harpsichordist Lillian Gordis between 2009 and 2013.

Discography

Solo Recordings 

 1990: Giles Farnaby: Farnaby's Dreame, Accord
 1990 : Wolfgang Amadeus Mozart: Concerti per cembalo ; Sonatas ; Menuets, Opus 111
 1993 : Domenico Scarlatti: 22 sonates, Astrée
 1993 : Bach: Goldberg Variationen [1992 Recording], Opus 111
 1994 : Bach: Concertos pour clavecin, Le Concert Français, Astrée
 1995 : John Bull: Doctor Bull's Good Night, Astrée
 1997 : Girolamo Frescobaldi: Partite et Toccate, Astrée
 1997 : Bach: Chromatic Fantasy and Fugue - Toccatas, Virgin Veritas
 1999 : Bach: Works for Harpsichord, Virgin Veritas
 2002 : Scarlatti 1, Ambroisie
 2002 : Scarlatti 2, Mirare
 2003 : Bach: Le Clavier bien tempéré, Premier livre, Mirare
 2004 : Bach: Variations Goldberg, Mirare
 2006 : Scarlatti 3, Mirare
 2008 : François Couperin: Pièces de clavecin, Mirare
 2012 : Jean-Philippe Rameau: Symphonies à deux clavecins, Mirare
 2014 : Bach: Suites anglaises no 2 et 6 ; Concerto italien, Mirare
 2014 : Magnificat et Concerti : A. Vivaldi, J.S. Bach, Jordi Savall & La Capella Reial de Catalunya, Alia Vox
 2014 : Bach: Concertos for Two Harpsichords, with Aapo Häkkinen, Helsinki Baroque Orchestra, Aeolus
 2016 : Scarlatti 4, Mirare
 2017 : Scarlatti 5, Mirare,  mention « Choc de Classica »
 2019 : Scarlatti 6, Mirare

Orchestral/Chamber Music 

 1991: Christmas Concerto, Sonatas after Concerti Grossi op. VI / Le Concert Français, Opus 111
1992 : Maskes & Fantazies / Le Concert Français. Naïve
 1997 : Marin Marais: Pièces de viole / Jérôme Hantaï. Virgin Veritas
 1997 : Jean-Marie Leclair: Sonates pour violon et basse continue, Livre IV / François Fernandez. Naïve
 2002 : Pavana: The Virgin Harpsichord / Skip Sempé. Astrée
 2003 : Marais: Pièces à deux et à trois violes / Jérôme Hantaï. Warner Classics
 2003 : Georg Philipp Telemann : Essercizii Musici / Le Concert Français. Naïve
 2005 : Bach: Sonates pour flûte / Marc Hantaï, Jérôme Hantaï. Warner Classics
 2005 : Marais: Pièces de viole, vol. 2 / Jérôme Hantaï. Warner Classics
 2006 : Bach: Suites pour orchestre nos. 1 & 4, Sonate pour violon et clavecin no. 4 / Le Concert Français. Mirare
 2018 : Bach: Sonatas for flute and harpsichord / Marc Hantaï. Mirare

References

External links
 
 Bach-cantatas.com: Pierre Hantaï - biography and photos
 Goldberg Web: Pierre Hantaï - biography and discography

1964 births
French harpsichordists
French performers of early music
French male conductors (music)
Musicians from Paris
Living people
21st-century French conductors (music)
21st-century French male musicians